Bayside Gardens is an unincorporated community in Tillamook County, Oregon, United States. It lies along Route 101 between Manzanita and Nehalem and borders Nehalem Bay. For statistical purposes, the United States Census Bureau has defined Bayside Gardens as a census-designated place (CDP). The census definition of the area may not precisely correspond to local understanding of the area with the same name. The population of the CDP was 880 at the 2010 census.

Demographics

References

Unincorporated communities in Tillamook County, Oregon
Unincorporated communities in Oregon